So Much Love may refer to:

"So Much Love" (Ben E. King song), 1966, covered by many other artists
"So Much Love" (Malaika song), 1992
"So Much Love" (The Rocket Summer song), 2007
"So Much Love", a song by Rock Goddess from the album Young and Free
"So Much Love", a song by Faith Hope and Charity, 1970.
"So Much Love", a song by Depeche Mode on the 2017 album Spirit

See also
"So Much Love to Give", song by Together (DJ Falcon & Thomas Bangalter)
"So Much Love", 2011 song by Fedde Le Grand, greatly sampling on above
"So Much Love", 2016, song by Muzzaik & Stadiumx, greatly sampling on above
"So Much Love for You", 2004 song by Japanese singer Kokia